Springbank is a historic home located at Roslyn Harbor in Nassau County, New York.  It was built about 1835 and expanded and modified in 1880.  A two-story rear addition was completed in 1959. It exhibits building construction and stylistic details from a number of periods.  The first renovation was a conversion of the original simple dwelling to a Swiss cottage style building.  Details added include the Dutch door main entry, full front porch, overhanging roof, front dormer, and a seven-foot addition.  It features a deep front porch on the front elevation with sawn brackets.  The property was once owned by the family of William Cullen Bryant.

It was added to the National Register of Historic Places in 1999.

References

Roslyn Harbor, New York
Houses on the National Register of Historic Places in New York (state)
Houses completed in 1880
Houses in Nassau County, New York
National Register of Historic Places in Nassau County, New York